Norway was represented at the 1976 Summer Olympics in Montreal by the Norwegian Olympic Committee and Confederation of Sports. 66 competitors, 60 men and 6 women, took part in 44 events in 11 sports.

Medalists

Gold
 Alf Hansen and Frank Hansen — Rowing, Men's double sculls

Silver
 Finn Tveter, Rolf Andreassen, Arne Bergodd, and Ole Nafstad — Rowing, Men's coxless four

Archery

In the second appearance by the nation in the archery competition at the Olympics, Norway was represented by only one man.  A veteran of the 1972 Summer Olympics, Jan Erik Humlekjær shot two points less than his performance of four years before.  Nevertheless, he moved up eight places in the ranking.

Men's Individual Competition:
 Jan Erik Humlekjær — 2337 points (→ 24th place)

Athletics

Men's 1500 metres
 Lars Martin Kaupang
 Heat — 3:44.59 min (→ did not advance)

Men's 5.000 metres
 Knut Børø
 Heat — did not start (→ did not advance, no ranking)

 Knut Kvalheim
 Heat — 13:20.60 min
 Final — 13:30.33 min (→ 9th place)

Men's 10.000 metres
 Knut Børø
 Heat — 28:23.07 min (→ advanced to the final)
 Final — did not finish (→ no ranking)

Men's High Jump
 Terje Totland
 Qualification — 2.16 m
 Final — 2.18m (→ 9th place)

 Leif Roar Falkum
 Qualification — 2.16 m
 Final — 2.10m (→ 14th place)

Men's Discus Throw
 Knut Hjeltnes
 Qualification — 61.30 m
 Final — 63.06 m (→ 7th place)

Men's Javelin Throw
 Terje Thorslund
 Qualification — 82.52 m
 Final — 78.24 m (→ 11th place)
 Bjørn Grimnes
 Qualification — 80.32 m
 Final — 74.88 m (→ 14th place)

Women's 1500 metres
 Grete Waitz
 Heat — 4:07.20 min
 Semi final — 4:04.80 min (→ did not advance)

Women's High Jump
 Astrid Tveit
 Qualification — 1.70 m (→ did not advance)

Canoeing

Cycling

Eight cyclists represented Norway in 1976.

Individual road race
 Thorleif Andresen — 4:49:01 (→ 38th place) 
 Geir Digerud — 5:04:42 (→ 55th place) 
 Pål Henning Hansen — did not finish (→ no ranking)
 Stein Bråthen — did not finish (→ no ranking)

Team time trial
 Stein Bråthen
 Geir Digerud
 Arne Klavenes
 Magne Orre

1000m time trial
 Harald Bundli — 1:08.093 (→ 7th place)

Individual pursuit
 Jan Georg Iversen — 7th place

Fencing

Five fencers, all men, represented Norway in 1976.

Men's épée
 Nils Koppang
 Jeppe Normann
 Ole Mørch

Men's team épée
 Nils Koppang, Jeppe Normann, Kjell Otto Moe, Bård Vonen, Ole Mørch

Rowing

Men's coxless fours
Ole Nafstad
Arne Bergodd
Finn Tveter
Rolf Andreassen

Men's coxed fours
Tom Amundsen
Kjell Sverre Johansen
Sverre Norberg
Rune Dahl
Alf Torp

Women's single sculls
Tone Pahle

Women's double sculls
Solfrid Johansen
Ingun Brechan

Sailing

Mixed One Person Dinghy
Tom Skjønberg

Mixed Two Person Dinghy
Hans Petter Jensen
Morten Jensen

Mixed Three Person Keelboat
Kim Torkildsen
Morten Rieker
Peder Lunde Jr.

Shooting

Mixed Free Pistol, 50 metres
John Rødseth

Mixed Small-Bore Rifle, Three Positions, 50 metres
Helge Anshushaug
Terje Melbye Hansen

Mixed Small-Bore Rifle, Prone, 50 metres
Terje Melbye Hansen
Helge Anshushaug

Mixed Running Target, 50 metres
Kenneth Skoglund

Swimming

Weightlifting

Wrestling

References

Nations at the 1976 Summer Olympics
1976 Summer Olympics
1976 in Norwegian sport